Lucas Poletto may refer to:

 Lucas Poletto (footballer, born 1994), Argentine midfielder or forward
 Lucas Poletto (footballer, born 1995), Brazilian forward